Geum Bo-ra (born Son Mi-ja on February 21, 1961) is a South Korean actress. She made her acting debut in 1979, and won Best New Actress at the 1980 Grand Bell Awards for Water Spray. She was active in Korean cinema in the 1980s, and when she grew older, switched to supporting roles in television.

Geum married businessman Oh Jae-hee in 1989, but financial problems led to their divorce in 2002. They have three sons: former Yonsei University basketball player Oh Seung-jun, Oh Seung-min, and a third son. She remarried in November 2005 to widowed businessman Kim Seong-taek, and one of her two stepdaughters is Kim Hyeon-jin.

Filmography

Film

Television series

Variety show

Awards and nominations

References

External links 
 
 
 

1961 births
Living people
People from Dangjin
South Korean television actresses
South Korean film actresses
20th-century South Korean actresses
21st-century South Korean actresses